Isaiah Stewart II (born May 22, 2001) Nicknamed "Beef Stew" is an American professional basketball player for the Detroit Pistons of the National Basketball Association (NBA). He played college basketball for the Washington Huskies.

Stewart attended McQuaid Jesuit High School in New York in his first two years of high school, after which he transferred to La Lumiere School, a prep school in Indiana. He was a consensus five-star recruit and was ranked among the top players in the 2019 class. Stewart earned McDonald's All-American honors and was named Mr. Basketball USA and Naismith Prep Player of the Year.

Early life
Stewart was born in Rochester, New York. He grew up playing soccer and boxing. Starting in fifth grade, Stewart focused on basketball, which he was drawn to because of his size and athleticism. He played organized basketball for the first time at age 10, while attending elementary school in Rochester.

High school career

Stewart attended McQuaid Jesuit High School in his first two years of high school. In his freshman season, Stewart averaged 18.5 points, 12.4 rebounds and 3.1 blocks per game, recording two back-to-back 40-point games, and was named Rochester City Athletic Conference player of the year. In October 2016, he broke his tailbone during United States national under-16 team tryouts and consequently missed most of his sophomore season. On February 2, 2017, Stewart returned to the court, posting 35 points, 14 rebounds, and six blocks in his season debut.

Entering his junior year, Stewart transferred to La Lumiere School, a prep school in La Porte, Indiana with a prestigious basketball program. In 19 games, he averaged 19.8 points, 11.2 rebounds, and 2.4 blocks per game, leading his team to a 25–4 record. Stewart earned MaxPreps Junior All-American honorable mention recognition. In his senior season with La Lumiere, he averaged 18.1 points, 11.3 rebounds, and 2.9 blocks per game, helping his team to a 30–1 record. Stewart won the Naismith Prep Player of the Year and Mr. Basketball USA awards. He was named to the USA Today All-USA first team and MaxPreps All-American second team. Stewart played in the McDonald's All-American Game, Jordan Brand Classic, and Nike Hoop Summit.

Recruiting
Stewart finished his high school career as a consensus five-star recruit and top-five player in the 2019 class. On January 21, 2019, he committed to playing college basketball for Washington. The other finalists to land him were Duke, Kentucky, Michigan State, and Syracuse. Stewart was drawn to Washington because of his longtime relationship with Mike Hopkins. He knew Hopkins, a former Syracuse assistant coach, since his time playing for McQuaid Jesuit.

College career
Heading into the season Stewart and teammate Jaden McDaniels were projected as potential top 3 picks for the 2020 NBA Draft and possibly going first and second. In part to this, Washington also received a lot of hype. Stewart made his college debut for UW against the Baylor Bears in the 2019 Armed Forces Classic, recording 15 points and seven rebounds, including the game-winning basket in a 67–64 victory for Washington. At the conclusion of the regular season, Stewart was named to the All-Pac-12 first team and the Freshman Team. Stewart posted 29 points and 12 rebounds against Arizona in the Pac-12 tournament. He averaged 17 points, 8.8 rebounds and 2.1 blocks per game as a freshman. On April 1, 2020, Stewart declared for the 2020 NBA draft, forgoing his remaining college eligibility.

Professional career

Detroit Pistons (2020–present)
Stewart was drafted 16th overall by the Portland Trail Blazers in the 2020 NBA draft. On November 22, 2020, Stewart, Trevor Ariza, and a conditional future first round pick were traded to the Houston Rockets in exchange for Robert Covington. On November 24, Stewart, Ariza, a future second round pick, and cash considerations were traded to the Detroit Pistons in exchange for Christian Wood, a protected future first round pick, and a second round pick in 2021. On December 1, the Pistons announced that they had signed Stewart to his rookie scale contract.

On November 21, 2021, Stewart was ejected in the third quarter after getting into a scuffle with LeBron James during a 116–121 loss to the Los Angeles Lakers. James initially hit Stewart in the face, which led to Stewart charging at James multiple times. Stewart had to be held back by multiple game officials and players. The next day, it was announced that Stewart would be suspended for two games for his actions.

On March 9, 2023, the Pistons announced that Stewart was diagnosed with a left shoulder impingement and would be sidelined for at least three-to-four weeks.

National team career
Stewart played for the United States at the 2018 FIBA Under-17 Basketball World Cup in Argentina. In seven games, he averaged 11.1 points and 8.4 rebounds per game. In the finals, Stewart led all scorers with 15 points and nine rebounds in a 95–52 win over France to capture the gold medal.

Career statistics

NBA

|-
| style="text-align:left;"| 
| style="text-align:left;"| Detroit
| 68 || 14 || 21.4 || .553 || .333 || .696 || 6.7 || .9 || .6 || 1.3 || 7.9
|-
| style="text-align:left;"| 
| style="text-align:left;"| Detroit
| 71 || 71 || 25.6 || .510 || .326 || .718 || 8.7 || 1.2 || .3 || 1.1 || 8.3
|-
| style="text-align:left;"| 
| style="text-align:left;"| Detroit
| 50 || 47 || 28.3 || .442 || .327 || .738 || 8.1 || 1.4 || .4 || .7 || 11.3
|- class="sortbottom"
| style="text-align:center;" colspan="2"| Career
| 189 || 132 || 24.8 || .501 || .328 || .721 || 7.8 || 1.1 || .4 || 1.0 || 9.0

College

|-
| style="text-align:left;"| 2019–20
| style="text-align:left;"| Washington
| 32 || 32 || 32.2 || .570 || .250 || .774 || 8.8 || .8 || .5 || 2.1 || 17.0

Personal life
Stewart's father Dela Stewart, who is a native of Jamaica, emigrated to the United States in the early 1970s for farm work. Later on, he moved to New York, where he met Stewart's mother Shameka Holloway and began working in construction. Stewart has worn the number 33 basketball jersey in honor of Jamaican former National Basketball Association (NBA) player Patrick Ewing.

References

External links

Washington Huskies bio
USA Basketball bio

2001 births
Living people
21st-century African-American sportspeople
African-American basketball players
American men's basketball players
American people of Jamaican descent
Basketball players from New York (state)
Centers (basketball)
Detroit Pistons players
La Lumiere School alumni
McDonald's High School All-Americans
Portland Trail Blazers draft picks
Power forwards (basketball)
Sportspeople from Rochester, New York
Washington Huskies men's basketball players